Institut Pendidikan Guru Malaysia Kampus Kota Bharu or IPGM Kampus KB (formerly known as Institut Perguruan Kota Bharu) is one of the teachers' colleges under Ministry Of Education situated in Pengkalan Chepa, Kota Bharu, Kelantan, Malaysia. It is owned by Ministry of Education and is also one of the oldest teacher's college in Malaysia, having been created before the independence of Malaysia.

Its various courses and programs include Program Ijazah Sarjana Muda Perguruan, Kursus Perguruan Lepasan Ijazah, and TESL.

Overview

IPGM Kampus KB headed by one Director who is appointed by the Ministry of Education, Malaysia. All of the college's graduates are appointed as government servants automatically to work as educators.

Kota Bharu District
Education schools in Malaysia
Universities and colleges in Kelantan
Educational institutions established in 1954
1954 establishments in Malaya